Hoerdt may refer to:
 Hördt, a municipality in the district of Germersheim, in Rhineland-Palatinate, Germany
 Hœrdt, a commune in the Bas-Rhin department in France